David Caleb Acevedo is a Puerto Rican writer. He was born in San Juan in 1980. His works include: 
 Historia del reguetón (poetry)
 Beyonce: voz de un ángel (poetry)
 Bad Bunny: música divina (poetry)
 From Pia Zadora to Rihanna: Why "Bad" Singers Are the Best (with Charlie Vázquez); 
 Wanda Rolón conoce mi alma  (short stories)
 Razones de mi celibato (short stories)
 Amores de telenovela (short stories) 
 el Reguetonero empedernido (novel)
 Historias para admirar a Ashley (Yo Soy La Bomba) (novel)
 Diario de una monja humilde (memoir)

References

Puerto Rican writers
1980 births
Living people